John Harlan "Speedy" Rush (1874 – August 31, 1958) was an American football player and coach and track athlete.  He served as the head football coach at Princeton University from 1915 to 1916 and at Cornell University in 1919, compiling career college football record of 15–9.  Rush was born in Waterloo, Iowa.  He played football at Grinell College as a halfback before entering Princeton in 1897.  At Princeton Rush ran track, worked as a newspaper correspondent, and attended football practice.  Rush graduated from Princeton in 1898 and relocated to Cleveland, Ohio, where he coached football and a number of other sports at University School, a private preparatory school.  Rush died at the age of 84, on August 31, 1958, at his daughter's home in Garden City, New York.

Head coaching record

College

References

1874 births
1958 deaths
19th-century players of American football
American football halfbacks
Cornell Big Red football coaches
Grinnell Pioneers football players
Princeton Tigers men's track and field athletes
Princeton Tigers football coaches
High school football coaches in Ohio
Sportspeople from Waterloo, Iowa
Players of American football from Iowa